The 2018 Citrus Bowl was an American college football bowl game played on January 1, 2018, at Camping World Stadium in Orlando, Florida. This was the 72nd edition of a game that has been played annually since 1946, under several different names.  It was one of the 2017–18 NCAA football bowl games concluding the 2017 NCAA Division I FBS football season. The game was nationally televised on ABC.  Sponsored by Overton's, a boating and marine supply retailer, the game was officially known as the Citrus Bowl presented by Overton's.

Teams
The game featured the independent Notre Dame Fighting Irish and the LSU Tigers of the Southeastern Conference; both teams finished the 2017 season with 9–3 records, and both teams finished in the top-20 of all major polls. Notre Dame, making their first appearance in the Citrus Bowl, was the designated visiting team.  LSU, the designated home team, appeared in the game for the second season in a row, and fifth time overall. For the second year in a row, no Big Ten team appeared in the Citrus Bowl; since Wisconsin committed to the Orange Bowl, the Citrus Bowl was allowed to pick Notre Dame or an Atlantic Coast Conference team.

This was the fourth bowl meeting between the Fighting Irish and Tigers, with LSU winning twice previously, and Notre Dame once. LSU prevailed 27–9 in the 1997 Independence Bowl, and 41–14 in the 2007 Sugar Bowl, and Notre Dame won 31–28 in the 2014 Music City Bowl. Notre Dame and LSU met eight times in the regular season between 1970 and 1998, with the Irish holding a 5–3 edge.

Notre Dame 

Notre Dame came into the game with a 9–3 record, having lost to Georgia, Miami (Florida), and Stanford. Each team they lost to was ranked in the top 20 of the AP Poll at the time they played.

LSU 

LSU came into the game with a 9–3 record overall, 6–2 in the SEC. Their two SEC losses were to Mississippi State and Alabama (who was ranked number one in the AP Poll at the time). Their one non-conference loss was to Troy of the Sun Belt Conference.

Game summary

Scoring summary

Statistics

References

Citrus Bowl
Citrus Bowl (game)
LSU Tigers football bowl games
Notre Dame Fighting Irish football bowl games
Citrus Bowl
Citrus Bowl